Osvaldo Wenzel (25 October 1911 – 26 October 1991) was a Chilean athlete. He competed in the men's decathlon at the 1936 Summer Olympics.

References

1911 births
1991 deaths
Athletes (track and field) at the 1936 Summer Olympics
Chilean decathletes
Olympic athletes of Chile
Place of birth missing